Levant bole is an earthy clay brought from the Levant, and historically used in medicine for the same purposes as Armenian bole. It was indeed so similar to Armenian bole that some believed them both to be the same, or at least mixtures of each other. Levant bole was used in several compositions, particularly diascodium, to give it color.

Chambers discusses two other similar boles: 
 Lemnian or Terra Lemia from the island of Lemnos, also called Sigillata
 Samnian or Terra Samia from the island of Samos

See also
Armenian bole

Natural materials
Medicinal clay